

Buildings and structures

Buildings
2670: The Pyramid of Djoser is built.

Births
 Imhotep, the first architect known by name.

Deaths

References 

BC
Architecture